Ninia pavimentata, the northern banded coffee snake, is a species of snake in the family Colubridae.  The species is native to Guatemala and Honduras.

References

Ninia
Snakes of Central America
Reptiles of Guatemala
Reptiles of Honduras
Reptiles described in 1883
Taxa named by Marie Firmin Bocourt